5316 Filatov, provisional designation , is a carbonaceous asteroid and potentially slow rotator from the outer region of the asteroid belt, approximately 30 kilometers in diameter.

The asteroid was discovered on 21 October 1982, by Russian astronomer Lyudmila Karachkina at the Crimean Astrophysical Observatory in Nauchnij on the Crimean peninsula. It was later named for surgeon Vladimir Filatov.

Orbit and classification 

Filatov orbits the Sun in the outer main-belt at a distance of 3.1–3.2 AU once every 5 years and 7 months (2,050 days). Its orbit has an eccentricity of 0.02 and an inclination of 15° with respect to the ecliptic. The body's observation arc begins at Nauchnij, 2 days after its official discovery observation.

Physical characteristics

Potentially slow rotator 

In November 2010, a rotational lightcurve of Filatov was obtained from photometric observations in the R-band at the Palomar Transient Factory in California. It gave an exceptionally long rotation period of 1061 hours with a brightness variation of 0.07 magnitude.

However, the fragmentary lightcurve has received a low quality rating by the Collaborative Asteroid Lightcurve Link which means that the result could be completely wrong (also see potentially slow rotator).

Diameter and albedo 

According to the survey carried out by NASA's Wide-field Infrared Survey Explorer with its subsequent NEOWISE mission, Filatov measures 45.69 kilometers in diameter, and its surface has an albedo of 0.019, while the Collaborative Asteroid Lightcurve Link assumes a standard albedo for carbonaceous asteroids of 0.057 and calculates a diameter of 22.95 kilometers with an absolute magnitude of 11.92.

Naming 

This minor planet was named in honor of Vladimir Filatov (1875–1956), a Russian and Ukrainian ophthalmologist and surgeon. The official naming citation was published by the Minor Planet Center on 1 September 1993.

References

External links 
 Asteroid Lightcurve Database (LCDB), query form (info )
 Dictionary of Minor Planet Names, Google books
 Asteroids and comets rotation curves, CdR – Observatoire de Genève, Raoul Behrend
 Discovery Circumstances: Numbered Minor Planets (5001)-(10000) – Minor Planet Center
 
 

005316
Discoveries by Lyudmila Karachkina
Named minor planets
19821021